Bohumil Janoušek (or Bob Janousek; born 7 September 1937) is a Czech rower who competed for Czechoslovakia in the 1960 Summer Olympics and in the 1964 Summer Olympics, and later moved to Britain as a rowing coach and then a boat-builder.

He was born in Prague. In 1960 he was a crew member of the Czechoslovak boat which won the bronze medal in the eights event. Four years later he won his second bronze medal with the Czechoslovak boat in the eights competition.

In 1969, Janousek, despite then speaking no English, was appointed as British national rowing coach. In the next seven years, he introduced training methods to British rowing that were already widespread elsewhere in Europe and formed the first British national rowing squad. Janousek stepped down as coach after the 1976 Olympic Games, at which Britain gained silver medals in double sculls and in eights, but stayed in Britain to form a boat-building business, Janousek Racing Boats.
In 2003, Bob was nominated for an OBE by a member of the 1975/76 national squad, which the British Cabinet Office declined.  The recommendation supported by significant rowing figures such as Mike Sweeney, Hugh Matheson and Richard Lester read as follows:"Bob Janousek was National Rowing Coach for Great Britain from 1969 to 1976.  At the time there was a deep malaise in British rowing with no medals in international championships since the 1964 Olympics.  The top clubs jealously guarded their best talent and resisted releasing their members to a national squad which added to the problems of forming top class international crews.  In his first years here Bob set up a coaching award scheme intended to pass his knowledge on to as many coaches as possible and thereby start building the foundations of a pyramid of talent from which would rise world beating crews.
In 1973 Bob overcame the resistance of the clubs to a national squad and was able to form a national squad by inviting the best oarsmen from all the clubs in Britain.  That same year, the double scull of Baillieu and Hart won a bronze medal at the European championships in Moscow and in 1974 the national VIII won a silver medal at the World Championships in Lucerne.  This VIII was composed of oarsmen who had been competing international for some years and typically being placed in the small final (i.e. 6 –12 th).  The national VIII coached by Bob repeated the silver medal success again at the 1976 Olympics.  This was at a time when the Soviet block sportsmen and women were training on a semi-professional, full-time basis.
Bob retired as national coach after the Montreal Olympics but thanks to him British rowing has never looked back.  Two of his influences in particular persist to this day: first, the introduction of modern coaching and training techniques and the dispersion of these throughout the country via the ARA coaching scheme.  Second and equally important, he installed a belief in the British rowing fraternity that we could produce medal winning crews, a belief that had been absent for some years.
Bob is a very unassuming character and despite the fact that since retiring as national rowing coach he has been building rowing boats, he has stayed out of the lime light to the extent that current British oarsmen and women have little understanding of the contribution he made to their success.  It is time that he received his just recognition."

References

External links
 profile

1937 births
Living people
Czech male rowers
Czechoslovak male rowers
Olympic rowers of Czechoslovakia
Rowers at the 1960 Summer Olympics
Rowers at the 1964 Summer Olympics
Olympic bronze medalists for Czechoslovakia
Olympic medalists in rowing
Medalists at the 1964 Summer Olympics
Medalists at the 1960 Summer Olympics
Rowers from Prague
European Rowing Championships medalists